Payas Pandit (born 31 December 1991), is an Indian film actress who works in Bhojpuri language films. She is known for her roles in films like Loha Pahalwan, Takrav, Bhabi Ji Ghar Par Hai (TV Series).

Career 
She has started her career in 2012 as an Anchor and came to Mumbai 2015 and had been featured in a show named “Sindbad” with Sagar Pictures which has been telecasted on Zee TV. She has done small roles in various TV Shows, worked as a model, did Print Shoots, ramp walked in Lakme Fashion Week and Gujarat Fashion Week. In 2016, she made her acting debut with Bhojpuri film named “Loha Pahalwan”. Moreover, she worked in films like - Takrao, Nagraj, Har Har Mahadev, etc. In 2018, she played a character in a TV show named “Karn Sangini” which was telecasted on Star Plus. She also worked in the Hindi television industry and gained popularity by playing the role of Poonam in the serial Patiala Babes, Mere Dad Ki Dulhan, and Bhabiji Ghar Par Hain!. In 2019, she worked in ZEE5's web series “Bombers (web series)” and also appeared in short film “Comedian” which is available on MX Player. In 2020, she has been featured in Indian thrill serial “Ishq Mein Marjawan 2”. In 2021, she played the role of female cop in movie “Afate Ishq”. At present, her show named “Bandhan Tute Na” is running successful on ZEE5.

Political career 
In 2021, she has joined Aam Aadmi Party (AAP) as an Utter Pradesh's State Spokesperson and is doing various social works for the benefit of society too.

Filmography

Films

Television

Web series 
All web series are in Hindi Language, otherwise noted the language.

References

External links 

 

1991 births
Living people
Indian film actresses
Indian television actresses
Actresses in Bhojpuri cinema
Actresses from Uttar Pradesh